Live: Barefoot at the Symphony is the fourth album and first live album of actress and singer Idina Menzel. The album was accompanied by a PBS special and later DVD. The album was recorded in Toronto, Ontario, Canada during Menzel's Barefoot at the Symphony Tour.

Track listing
Life of the Party from The Wild Party
The Professor
Love for Sale from The New Yorkers/Roxanne by The Police
"You Were Good"
Funny Girl/Don't Rain on My Parade from Funny Girl
Asleep on the Wind by Jimmy Webb
Jonathan
No Day But Today from Rent
Poker Face by Lady Gaga
Marvin's Long Lost Brother (track by Marvin Hamlisch)
Where or When from Babes in Arms (duet with Taye Diggs)
Heaven Help My Heart from Chess
Thank You
For Good from Wicked (a capella)
Defying Gravity from Wicked
Tomorrow from Annie

Charts

References

2012 live albums
Idina Menzel albums